Chrysoritis thysbe, the opal copper or common opal, is a butterfly of the family Lycaenidae. It is found in South Africa.

The wingspan is 24–32 mm for males and 23–35 mm for females. Adults are on wing year-round with peaks in October and March.

The larvae feed on Chrysanthemoides incana, C. monilifera, Osteospermum polygaloides, Lebeckia plukenetiana, Aspalathus, Zygophyllum and Thesium species. They are attended to by Crematogaster peringueyi ants.

Subspecies
Chrysoritis thysbe (nominate subspecies)
Range: Cape Peninsula to Mossel Bay, north to Lamberts Bay, inland to Piketberg and Citrusdal
Chrysoritis thysbe subsp. osbecki (Aurivillius, 1882)
Chrysoritis thysbe subsp. psyche (Pennington, 1967)
Range: from Bitterfontein south to Nardouwsberg in the Western Cape
Chrysoritis thysbe subsp. bamptoni (Dickson, 1976)
Range: Hondeklipbaai area, inland to Wallekraal in the Northern Cape
Chrysoritis thysbe subsp. schloszae (Dickson, 1994)
Range: Moorreesburg area in the Western Cape
Chrysoritis thysbe subsp. whitei (Dickson, 1994)
Range: Port Elizabeth area in the Eastern Cape
Chrysoritis thysbe subsp. mithras (Pringle, 1995)
Range: Stilbaai to Brenton-on-Sea in the Western Cape

References

Butterflies described in 1764
Chrysoritis
Endemic butterflies of South Africa
Taxa named by Carl Linnaeus